Pyroban began as a project implemented by Imperial Chemical Industries (ICI) after the accidental release and ignition of a flammable vapour by a diesel engine at its Wilton Plant in the UK in 1969.

In 1972 Power Research Ltd was formed by Phil Tyrer, to offer a sub-contract prototype design and development service to prevent industrial equipment creating an explosion in a flammable atmosphere. Power Research carried out development work for the Pyroban project and in 1974 changed its name to Pyroban Ltd offering explosion proof solutions to industries such as oil and gas, mining and manufacturing.

In 1980 the company pioneered gas detection used on battery electric vehicles such as forklift trucks so that they could be used in areas where flammable gas or vapour is present.  This method is still being used today.

Pyroban was acquired by Caterpillar Inc. on 31 August 2011.  

As of 17 November 2017, safety company Pyroban is under new ownership after Caterpillar Inc. divested its 100% interest in the Pyroban Group.

References

External links
Official homepage
Safety equipment